is a Japanese politician. He was the Minister of State for Regulatory Reform, the Minister of State for Industrial Revitalization Corporation of Japan, the Minister of State for Administrative Reform, the Minister of State for Special Zones for Structural Reform and the Minister of State for Regional Revitalization in Japanese Prime Minister Junichiro Koizumi's Cabinet.

He received his Bachelor of Arts degree in Law from Tokyo University, and was first elected in 1986 to the House of Representatives in Ehime Prefecture.

External links 
 http://www.kantei.go.jp/foreign/koizumidaijin/040927/17murakami_e.html

1952 births
Living people
Politicians from Ehime Prefecture
University of Tokyo alumni
Government ministers of Japan
Members of the House of Representatives (Japan)
21st-century Japanese politicians